Alexandre, de Lesseps (born ) is a French entrepreneur and pioneer of microfinancing in developing countries. He serves as President of Pandaw Investment Holdings of Hong Kong, which invests in Myanmar. Until 2013, he was Chairman of Coral Capital Group and was one of the founder investors in the rebuilt Saratoga Hotel in Havana, Cuba. In 2012, he became a director at Leopard Capital, a private equity firm investing in Cambodia, Haiti, and various other frontier markets. He was a co-founder and Director of Blue Orchard Finance S.A. of Geneva, a leading microfinance management company.

Early life
Alexandre de Lesseps was born in Paris, France.

Career
De Lesseps's film career started while he served in the military of France, where he was enrolled in the film department. He went on to become a producer of TV films with TelFrance in Paris, Inter Tel in Munich and Telvetia in Switzerland. He became the CEO of Intertel USA Inc and Tanit Productions, in Los Angeles, in 1984. Alexandre de Lesseps founded the company Les Laboratoires de I’Atlantique in 1986, which is a French personal care manufacturer. In the 80s de Lesseps became the manager of a private equity fund in Asia, due to his increased interest in the emerging market.

In 1988 he founded The Myanmar Children Association MCA with his partner Mark Tippetts and their friend Ricardo Sicre. MCA has built a 100 pupil school in Kakku, in the Pa-O country in the Shan plateau east of Taunggyi, the capital of Shan State. In 1999 MCA built the first modern maternity clinic beside the school in Kakku. In 2001 MCA completed its first orphanage for boys above the village of Main Thauk, Lake Inle. Built on 11 acres of land with panoramic views across the Lake, the Orphanage sits on the historic site of the first British encampment in the Shan States, Fort Stedman built in 1860. Over 50 boys reside at the Orphanage, and attend the high school in Main Thauk. In 2002 MCA held the grand opening of its second orphanage where 60 girls now live. MCA fully supports the advanced education of ten of these girls on an ongoing basis at Taunggyi University. In addition MCA has sponsored another orphanage on Lake Inle in the nearby village of Mee Thwe Pote, and also funds all the overheads of the Day-Care Center in the village of Main Thauk.

Award
De Lesseps received the Fulbright Humanitarian Award in 2004 at the United Nations in New York.

Personal life
He is a descendant of Ferdinand de Lesseps, the famous French diplomat and entrepreneur who built the Suez Canal and started the Panama Canal. 
His fourth wife was Luann de Lesseps, an American television personality and former fashion model. With Luann he had two children, Noel and Victoria.

References

Living people
1940s births
Counts of France
Alexandre
Businesspeople from Paris